"When You Lie Next to Me" is a debut song co-written and recorded by American country music artist Kellie Coffey.  It was released in December 2001 as the lead-off single and title track from her album When You Lie Next to Me.  To date, it is Coffey's only Top 10 hit on the U.S. Billboard Hot Country Singles & Tracks chart.  Coffey wrote this song with J.D. Martin and Trina Harmon.

Content
"When You Lie Next to Me" is a country ballad, backed by piano and strings with steel guitar fills. The song's female narrator describes telling her lover of the intense feelings she has for him whenever "[he] lies next to [her]," insisting that they don't waste any chance to spend time with each other.

Critical reception
In his review of the album, Stephen Thomas Erlewine of Allmusic indicated the song as one of the standout tracks, and mentioning that it "could be [a] staple on adult contemporary radio.

Music video 
The music video was directed by Deaton-Flanigen Productions. In the video, Coffey is shown performing the song from various locations within a large house: standing in a hallway with the wind blowing in, sitting on a pillow surrounded by lit candles, and resting on a pedestal in the middle of a pool.

Chart performance
"When You Lie Next to Me," after spending 33 weeks on the chart, reached a peak of number 8 on the U.S. Billboard Hot Country Singles & Tracks chart for the week of July 13, 2002. The song also had crossover success on the U.S. Billboard Hot Adult Contemporary Tracks chart, achieving a peak of number 14 in January 2003.

Year-end charts

References

Kellie Coffey songs
2001 songs
2001 debut singles
Music videos directed by Deaton-Flanigen Productions
Songs written by J. D. Martin (songwriter)
Song recordings produced by Dann Huff
BNA Records singles